Georg Ludwig Hartig (September 2, 1764 – February 2, 1837) was a German forester.

Education 
Hartig was born at Gladenbach, in present-day Hesse. After obtaining a practical knowledge of forestry from his uncle at Harzburg, he studied from 1781 to 1783 at the University of Giessen, which had commenced a course of instruction in forestry just a few years earlier, in 1778.

Career 
In 1786, Hartwig was appointed as Manager of Forests for the Prince of Solms-Braunfels at Hungen, in the Wetterau, Hesse. While in this position, he founded a school for the teaching of forestry, one of the first dedicated schools of forestry in Europe.

After a decade in Hungen, in 1797, he received an appointment as Inspector of Forests to the Prince of Orange-Nassau and moved to Dillenburg, continuing his school of forestry there. Attendance increased considerably in Dillenburg. On the dissolution of the principality by Napoleon I of France in 1805 he lost his position.

In 1806, Hartig went to Stuttgart as Chief Inspector of Forests. Five years later, in 1811, he was called to Berlin in a similar capacity. There he reestablished his school once again, succeeding in connecting it with the University of Berlin.

Hartwig received an appointment as Honorary Professor at the University of Berlin in 1830. He died at Berlin on 2 February 1837.

Sons
His son Theodor Hartig (1805–1880) and grandson Robert Hartig (1839–1901) also were distinguished for their contributions to the study of forestry.

Works (selection) 
 Anweisung zur Holzzucht für Förster, Marburg 1791 (Directions for Wood-breeding for Foresters)
 Physicalische Versuche über das Verhältniß der Brennbarkeit der meisten deutschen Wald-Baum-Hölzer...etc., 1794
 Anweisung  zur Taxation der Forste oder zur Bestimmung des Holzertrags der Wälder...etc., Gießen 1795
 Grundsätze der Forst-Direktion, Hadamer: Neue Gelehrten Buchhandlung 1803
 Lehrbuch für Förster und die es werden wollen...etc.,(3 vols.), Stuttgart 1808 (Textbook for Foresters and ...)
 Kubiktabellen für geschnittene, beschlagene und runde Hölzer...etc., 1815 (4th ed. Berlin and Elbing, 1837; 10th ed. Berlin, 1871)
 Lehrbuch für Jäger und die es werden wollen...etc., (2 vols.), Stuttgart 1810/1812 (Textbook for Hunters and...)
 Beitrag zur Lehre von der Ablösung der Holz-, Streu- und Weideservituten, Berlin 1829
 Die Forstwissenschaft in ihrem Umfange...etc., Berlin 1831 (Forest Science in its Scope...) 
 Lexikon für Jäger und Jagdfreunde oder waidmännisches Conversations-Lexikon, 1836 (2nd ed. Berlin, 1859–1861) (Lexicon for Hunters and Hunting Companions or the Country-Sportsman's Conversations-Lexicon)

Literature 
 Hans Joachim Weimann: Hartigiana - Kurze Lebens- und Familiengeschichte des Staatsrathes und Ober-Landforstmeisters Georg Ludwig Hartig und dessen Gattin Theodore, geborene Klipstein. Wiesbaden 1990
 ders: Georg Ludwig Hartig in: Biographien bedeutender hessischer Forstleute. Georg-Ludwig-Hartig-Stiftung & J. D. Sauerländer, Wiesbaden und Frankfurt am Main 1990. 
 Theodora Hartig, Karl Hasel, Wilhelm Mantel (eds.): Georg Ludwig Hartig im Kreise seiner Familie. Kurze Lebens- und Familiengeschichte des Staatsrats und Oberlandforstmeisters Georg Ludwig Hartig. Göttingen 1976
 Autorenkollektiv: Georg Ludwig Hartig (1764–1837) zum 150. Todestage. (Festakt zum 11. März 1987 in Gladenbach; Vorträge und Dokumentation.) Mitteilungen der Hessischen Landesforstverwaltung, Band 21. Sauerländer,  Frankfurt am Main 1987,

Notes

References

External links 

 Georg-Ludwig-Hartig-Stiftung
 

1764 births
1837 deaths
People from Marburg-Biedenkopf
German foresters
German hunters
Forestry academics
History of forestry education
University of Giessen alumni
Academic staff of the Humboldt University of Berlin
German male writers